American actress Michelle Williams wore a saffron-colored Vera Wang dress to the 78th Academy Awards on March 5, 2006, which was the subject of acclaim in the fashion press.

Design
Katherine E. Krohn in her book Vera Wang: Enduring Style said as follows, "Wang has always loved paying close attention to the details and careful work needed for a couture garment. She brought this quality to the saffron yellow gown she made for actress Michelle Williams. After making hundreds of sketches and working personally with the actress, Wang chose a final design for the dress. Then the gown was painstakingly cut and fit to William's body, using a mock-up fabric rather than a final cloth. At last, a skilful seamstress constructed the chiffon and tulle gown, which had a deep neckline and dramatic ruffles."

Reception
Cosmopolitan cited the dress as one of the best Oscar dresses of all time, saying, "Coupled with the bright red lips and wispy hair, Michelle's saffron Vera Wang dress makes her look like she's straight out of an old Hollywood film. The cut makes her body look amazing, especially considering that she had given birth to Matilda just three months before." The Daily Telegraph named the dress as one of the most memorable Oscar dresses of all time.

See also
 List of individual dresses

References

2000s fashion
2006 in fashion
2006 clothing
Outfits worn at the Academy Awards ceremonies
Vera Wang, Williams